USS S-16 (SS-121) was a second-group (S-3 or "Government") S-class submarine of the United States Navy.

Consytruction and commissioning
S-16′s keel was laid down on 19 March 1918 by the Lake Torpedo Boat Company in Bridgeport, Connecticut. She was launched on 23 December 1919 sponsored by Mrs. Archibald W. McNeil, and commissioned on 17 December 1920.

Service history

1921–1935
Departing from New London, Connecticut, on 31 May 1921, S-16 was attached to Submarine Division 18 (SubDiv 18) and proceeded via the Panama Canal, California, Hawaii, and Guam to the Philippine Islands. She arrived at Cavite, Luzon, on 1 December 1921.

S-16 departed Cavite on 11 October 1922, visited Hong Kong from 14 to 28 October, and returned to Cavite on 1 November 1922. Departing Manila on 15 May 1923, she visited Shanghai, Chefoo, and Chinwangtao in China before returning, via Woosung and Amoy, to Cavite on 11 September 1923. In the summer of 1924, she visited Shanghai, Tsingtao, Chefoo, and Chinwangtao, returning to Olongapo in the Philippines on 23 September 1924. Departing Cavite on 3 November 1924, she arrived at Mare Island, California, on 30 December 1924.

S-16 remained at Mare Island in 1925 and 1926, and operated along the California coast in 1927, with a visit to Hawaii in July–August 1927. From February 1928 until 1935, S-16 served in the Panama Canal area although she visited Baltimore, Maryland, from 15 May to 5 June 1933. Departing Coco Solo in the Panama Canal Zone on 25 January 1935, S-16 was decommissioned at Philadelphia, Pennsylvania, on 22 May 1935.

1940–1944

S-16 was recommissioned on 2 December 1940. Following voyages to Bermuda and the Panama Canal Zone, she operated at Saint Thomas in the United States Virgin Islands from December 1941 (during which the United States entered World War II with the Japanese attack on Pearl Harbor on 7 December) to March 1942, then in the Panama Canal area from April to August 1942. On 13 July 1942, she was on the surface in the Caribbean Sea off Panama when she suffered damage from bombs accidentally dropped near her by United States Army Air Forces planes attacking the German U-boat ; the damage prevented her from diving, and she proceeded to port on the surface. S-16 was based at New London from September 1942 to June 1944, with operations at Casco Bay, Maine.

Decommissioning and disposal
S-16 was decommissioned on 4 October 1944 and struck from the Naval Vessel Register. She was intentionally destroyed by sinking off Key West, Florida, on 3 April 1945.

Wreck
The Gulf Stream flows over the hull, allowing little coral growth and making wreck diving difficult to impossible. The wreck is accessible through large hatches both forward and aft of the conning tower. Both steel screws are covered by invertebrate growth.

In literature 

A fictional USS S-16 appears in Edward L. Beach, Jr.'s 1955 novel Run Silent, Run Deep. In the novel, the fictional S-16 is taken out of decommissioned status, recommissioned and prepared for war by the charcaters in the story, and then turned over to the Polish Navy.

References

Citations

Bibliography
 Hinman, Charles R., and Douglas E. Campbell. The Submarine Has No Friends: Friendly Fire Incidents Involving U.S. Submarines During World War II. Syneca Research Group, Inc., 2019. .

S-16
World War II submarines of the United States
Ships built in Bridgeport, Connecticut
1919 ships
Ships sunk as targets
Shipwrecks of the Florida Keys
Friendly fire incidents of World War II
Maritime incidents in July 1942
Maritime incidents in April 1945